Jan Willem may refer to

People
 Jan Willem Beyen (1897–1976), Dutch diplomat
 Jan Willem Boudewijn Gunning (1860–1913), Dutch doctor 
 Jan-Willem Breure (born 1988), Dutch media producer and artist
 Jan Willem de Jong (1921–2000), Dutch indologist
 Jan Willem de Pous (1920–1996), Dutch politician
 Jan Willem de Winter (1761–1812), Dutch Admiral
 Jan-Willem Gabriëls (born 1979), Dutch Olympic rower
 Jan Willem Hunter Morkel (1890–1916), South African rugby union player
 Jan Willem Janssens (1762–1838), Dutch nobleman
 Jan Willem Pieneman (1779–1853), Dutch artist
 Jan Willem Spruyt (1826–1908), South African statesman
 Jan Willem Storm van Leeuwen, Dutch chemist
 Jan Willem te Kolsté (1874–1936), Dutch chess master
 Jan Willem van Ede (born 1963), Dutch footballer

Ships
 , Dutch cargo ship in service 1950-51

See also
 Jan Willems (died 1688), Dutch pirate